Miss Arizona is a 1988 Hungarian drama film directed by Pál Sándor.

Cast
 Marcello Mastroianni as Sandor Rozsnyai
 Hanna Schygulla as Mitzi Rozsnyai
 Alessandra Martines as Marta
 Urbano Barberini as Stanley
 Augusto Poderosi as German officer
 Sándor Zsótér as Andras
 Matteo Rocchietta as young Andras
 Juli Básti as Eva
 Dorottya Udvaros as Zsuzsa
 Gyula Szabó as Rozsnyai (voice)
 Mária Varga as Mitzi (voice)
 Kati Kovács as Mitzi (singing voice)
 Anna Fehér as Mitzi (voice)
 János Csernák as (voice)
 Berta Domínguez D. (as Berta Domínguez)
 Hédi Temessy (voice)
 Pál Mácsai (voice)

Critical reception
Dan Pavlides of All Movie Guide said that the film had "uneven editing in places suggests that a lot of film ended up on the cutting-room floor."

References

External links

1988 films
1980s Hungarian-language films
1988 drama films
Films directed by Pál Sándor
Films scored by Armando Trovajoli
Hungarian drama films